Protea grandiceps, commonly known as rooisuikerbos, suikerbos or red sugarbush, is a flowering shrub that belongs to the Protea genus and is native to parts south western parts of South Africa. 
The shrub was listed as a near threatened species in 2006 according to the South African National Biodiversity Institute.

Description
Fire destroys the plant but the seeds survive. The seed is stored in a cap and spread by the wind. The plant is unisexual. Pollination occurs through the action of birds. The tree's national number is 89.2.

Taxonomy
The species was first formally described by the botanist Leopold Trattinnick, the specific epithet means large head and is derived from the Latin words grandis meaning great or large and ceps meaning head in reference to the flower-heads.

Distribution
It is spread over a total area of around  composed of fragmented populations.

References

grandiceps
Shrubs
Flora of South Africa